Douglas Gordon Perry (born 1967) is a United States Navy rear admiral and submarine warfare officer who serves as the director of the Undersea Warfare Division of the United States Navy since July 16, 2021. He most recently served as the commander of Submarine Group 9 from January 25, 2019 to June 8, 2021.

Perry earned a Bachelor of Science in Aerospace Engineering from the United States Naval Academy in 1989. He also holds a master's degree in Civil Engineering from Marquette University.

Awards and decorations

References

Date of birth missing (living people)
1967 births
Living people
Place of birth missing (living people)
United States Naval Academy alumni
Marquette University alumni
United States submarine commanders
Recipients of the Meritorious Service Medal (United States)
Recipients of the Legion of Merit
United States Navy admirals
Recipients of the Defense Superior Service Medal